Derek Atkins (born 8 April 1961 in Glasgow) is a Scottish former football goalkeeper.

Atkins started his career with junior club Bridgeton Waverley before moving to Queens Park in 1978. He made 166 league appearances for the club before joining Clyde in 1983, where he stayed for 7 years.

He had short stints at East Fife and Stranraer before retiring from the senior game. He then moved to Beith Juniors where he is recognised as one of their greatest ever goalkeepers in his spell from 1990 to 1994 and was known as a penalty save specialist. He had 41 clean sheets from 140 appearances with Beith Juniors.

External links

Living people
1961 births
Scottish footballers
Queen's Park F.C. players
Clyde F.C. players
Bridgeton Waverley F.C. players
East Fife F.C. players
Stranraer F.C. players
Scottish Football League players
Association football goalkeepers
Footballers from Glasgow